Family of Love is the second EP by American indie pop band Dom, released on August 9, 2011 by Astralwerks.

Track listing

References

2011 EPs
Dom (band) albums
Astralwerks albums